Michael Flanagan (15 March 1842 – 14 January 1890) was an English first-class cricketer active 1873–78 who played for Middlesex. He was born in Glen Colombkill, County Clare; died in Paddington.

References

1842 births
1890 deaths
English cricketers
Middlesex cricketers
Marylebone Cricket Club cricketers
North v South cricketers